The Maidu Museum & Historic Site is an interpretive center museum dedicated to public education about the Maidu peoples.

The museum sits at an ancient site where Nisenan Maidu families lived for 3,000 years. Hundreds of bedrock mortar holes, petroglyphs on sandstone boulders, rock art, and a vast midden area are evidence of thousands of years of residence. The site has been on the National Register of Historic Places since 1973.

The site is unique in the presentation of Maidu life. The museum offers interpretive programs, exhibits, multi-media presentations, and special events.

Exhibits
The center contains several permanent exhibits.

See also
California State Indian Museum

References

External links
Maidu Museum & Historic Site - official site

Museums in Placer County, California
Native American museums in California
American West museums in California
Buildings and structures in Roseville, California
Archaeological sites on the National Register of Historic Places in California
National Register of Historic Places in Placer County, California